Nichollssaura is an extinct genus of leptocleidid plesiosaur from the Early Cretaceous Boreal Sea of North America.  The type species is N. borealis, found in the early Albian age Clearwater Formation near Fort McMurray, Alberta, Canada. 

It fills an approximate 40-million-year gap in the fossil record of North American plesiosaurs. 

 
The type specimen was discovered in one of Syncrude Canada Ltd.'s open-pit oilsand mines near Fort McMurray, Alberta, in 1994. The fossil is on display at the Royal Tyrrell Museum of Palaeontology, missing only the left forelimb and scapula, lost when the specimen was discovered accidentally by 100-ton electric shovel operators Greg Fisher and Lorne Cundal.

Etymology
The fossil, named after paleontological curator Dr. Betsy Nicholls, originally was named Nichollsia borealis but Nichollsia was already in use (preoccupied) by a genus of isopods.  Thus, the original authors proposed Nichollssaura as a replacement generic name in 2009.

See also

 List of plesiosaur genera
 Timeline of plesiosaur research

References

External links 
 http://news.nationalgeographic.com/news/2008/03/080326-ancient-reptile.html
 http://palaeoblog.blogspot.com/2008/03/betsys-plesiosaur-nichollsia-borealis.html
 https://web.archive.org/web/20080404012601/http://scienceblogs.com/laelaps/2008/03/details_on_nichollsia_borealis.php

Early Cretaceous plesiosaurs
Early Cretaceous reptiles of North America
Fossil taxa described in 2009
Sauropterygian genera